Ali Sabah Adday Al-Qaysi (born 1 January 1977) is an Iraqi football referee who has been a full international referee for FIFA.

Sabah became a FIFA referee in 2002. He has served as a referee at competitions including the 2018 FIFA World Cup qualifiers, beginning with the preliminary-round match between Palestine and United Arab Emirates.

AFC Asian Cup

References

External links 
 
 

1977 births
Living people
Iraqi football referees
Sportspeople from Baghdad
AFC Asian Cup referees